Thirteen Ghosts (also known as 13 Ghosts and stylized as THIR13EN Ghosts) is a 2001 supernatural horror film directed by Steve Beck in his directorial debut. A remake of the 1960 film 13 Ghosts by William Castle, the film stars Tony Shalhoub, Embeth Davidtz, Matthew Lillard, Shannon Elizabeth, Alec Roberts, Rah Digga, and F. Murray Abraham. It was released to theaters on October 26, 2001.

The film was unsuccessful critically and grossed $68 million against its $42 million budget.

Plot 
Ghost hunter Cyrus Kriticos and his psychic assistant Dennis Rafkin lead a team on a mission to capture a spirit called the Juggernaut. Several men, including Cyrus, are killed while the team is able to catch the ghost. Cyrus's nephew Arthur, a widower, is informed by Cyrus's estate lawyer, Ben Moss, that he has inherited Cyrus' mansion. Financially insecure, Arthur decides to move there with his two children, Kathy and Bobby, and their nanny, Maggie.

Dennis meets the family as they tour the mansion. The residence is made entirely of glass sheets inscribed with Latin phrases, which Dennis recognizes as barrier spells. He discovers that the twelve angry ghosts he and Cyrus captured are imprisoned in the house, held captive by the spells. As he warns Arthur, Moss unwittingly triggers a mechanism that seals the house and releases the ghosts. Moss dies when a set of sliding doors cut him in half. Bobby sees several of the ghosts, including the Withered Lover -- his mother Jean, who had died of injuries sustained in a house fire. He is knocked unconscious and dragged away.

Dennis uses a pair of spectral glasses that allow the wearer to see the supernatural realm to avoid the ghosts. The Jackal, one of the most dangerous ghosts, attacks Kathy and Arthur but they are saved by Kalina Oretzia, a spirit liberator who is attempting to free the ghosts. Kathy disappears. The four adults gather in the library where Arthur learns that Jean's ghost is also in the house. Kalina explains that the house is a machine, powered by the captive ghosts, that allows its user to see the past, present, and future. The only way to shut it down is through the creation of a thirteenth ghost from a sacrifice of love. Arthur realizes that he must become that ghost to save his children.

Armed with the spectral glasses, Arthur and Dennis enter the basement to find the children. Dennis barricades Arthur behind a glass sheet for his protection. Dennis is then beaten to death by the Hammer and the Juggernaut, two other dangerous ghosts. It is revealed that Cyrus faked his death to lure Arthur to the house; Kalina is his partner, revealed when she knocks Maggie unconscious with a large book and promptly kisses Cyrus upon his arrival. Cyrus has orchestrated the abduction of Kathy and Bobby so that Arthur will become the thirteenth ghost, which will not stop the machine as Kalina had claimed, but trigger its activation. Cyrus kills Kalina, who objected to Cyrus putting the children in danger, and summons the ghosts to activate the machine.

In the main hall, Arthur witnesses all twelve ghosts orbiting a clockwork device of rotating metal rings, with his children at the center. He fights Cyrus while Maggie disrupts the machine's controls, releasing the ghosts from its power and causing the machine to go haywire. The ghosts hurl Cyrus into the moving rings, slicing him to pieces. With the encouragement of Dennis' ghost, Arthur jumps through the machine safely to protect his children. The walls of the house shatter as the malfunctioning machine rips itself apart, freeing the ghosts. Jean's ghost tells them she loves them before she disappears.

As the family departs from the house, Maggie angrily declares that she is quitting as their nanny.

Cast

The Ghosts 
While the backstories for nearly all the ghosts are not mentioned in the movie, they are hinted at and are explicitly described in the "Ghost Files", a special feature on the DVD, with Cyrus as the narrator. With a few exceptions, they seem to become more dangerous as their numbers increase.

 The First Born Son: (played by Mikhael Speidel) A ghost of a little bratty boy named Billy Michaels, who loved to pretend to be a cowboy. One day, another little kid challenged Billy to a duel, but Billy's cap gun was no match for that boy's real steel- tipped arrow that Billy's ghost still carries. Unlike most of the ghosts, this one is a mild threat, never attacking anyone and just saying "I want to play."
 The Torso: (played by Daniel Wesley) Jimmy 'The Gambler' Gambino was a gambler in the early 1900s, who caught the attention of the Mafia. After he lost a boxing bet and didn't have the money to pay up, the Mafia cut him into pieces and wrapped him in cellophane, dumping the remains in the ocean. His ghost appears as a torso with a severed head nearby, and is more a neutral spirit than actively hostile.
 The Bound Woman: (played by Laura Mennell) Susan LeGrow was the richest girl in town and was very popular. Her one flaw was the way she toyed with boys and men. During her senior prom night, she was killed by a jilted ex named Chet Walters, a star quarterback, after catching her cheating with another guy. Her ghost lures Bobby into the dangerous basement and still shows in her prom attire, bound ropes holding her arms.
 The Withered Lover: (played by Kathryn Anderson) Jean Kriticos was a happy and devoted wife and mother. She died as a result of fire injuries at St Luke's Hospital half a year before the events of the film begin. Unlike most of the ghosts, she is not dangerous; she is benevolent.
 The Torn Prince: (played by Craig Olejnik) Royce Clayton was a gifted and famous teenage baseball player in the 1950s who caught the eye of colleges around the USA. He died in a drag race, thanks to his challenger, a greaser  who cut his brake lines. His remains are still buried at the baseball diamond, and his ghost carries his baseball bat.
 The Angry Princess: (played by Shawna Loyer)  Dana Newman was a beautiful but abused lady who lived in the late 20th century. She had plastic surgeries to alter her perceived flaws, and after a botched experiment that mutilated her eye, she brutally killed herself in a bathtub at the clinic. Her ghost is bloody, naked, and carries the same knife she used to commit suicide.
 The Pilgrimess: (played by Xantha Radley) Isabella Smith came to North America as a colonist in order to find a new life after being an orphan in England. The tight-knit community ostracized and ignored her and used her as a scapegoat, being accused of witchcraft when crops and animals mysteriously died. She denied such accusations, but she was trapped in a burning barn but managed to escape unharmed. That sealed her fate, and she died of starvation after being condemned to the pillory that she carries with her as a ghost; her skin is badly damaged.
 The Great Child: (played by C. Ernst Harth) Harold Shelburne was a mentally disabled man who never outgrew diapers and had to be spoon fed even as a fully grown adult; he often made baby sounds. After being mocked, teased and tormented relentlessly all his life, he caused a massacre at the old freak show where he and his mother, Margaret Shelburne, lived. Some of the freaks had kidnapped and killed his mother as a joke one night. The circus owner, Jimbo, had Harold mutilated beyond recognition. His ghost appears as Harold did in life, with a small patch of hair, a bib covered in vomit, and cloth diapers; he still holds the ax that he used to kill his enemies.
 The Dire Mother: (played by Laurie Soper) Margaret Shelburne, Harold's mother, was a shy little lady, standing three feet tall. She never could stand up for herself. At the freak show where she lived, she was raped by the Tall Man, another circus freak, and gave birth to her illegitimate son Harold, whom she loved more than life itself. She smothered and spoiled him from infancy and never stopped as he grew; this is the main reason for Harold's mental handicap. The two were abused to the point where Harold killed almost the entire circus after Margaret died. As ghosts, they remain together, with Harold being protective. Like the Torso, she is not aggressive, and is more of a neutral spirit.
 The Hammer: (played by Herbert Duncanson) A happy and honest family man and blacksmith, George Markeley was falsely accused of stealing by a higher up named Nathan, and threatened with exile from their old Western town. George refused to leave, and his family was lynched by Nathan and his band of thugs while walking home from the town market one day. Seeking justice in the corrupt town, George took his blacksmith's hammer and killed those responsible, but the townsfolk chained him to a tree and drove railroad spikes into his body. His left hand was cut off and his hammer was crudely attached to it. His ghost is one of the more angry spirits, and is partially responsible for Dennis' death.
 The Jackal: (played by Shayne Wyler) Born to a prostitute in 1887, Ryan Khun developed a sick appetite for women, attacking and raping strays and prostitutes in the night. He voluntarily went to Borehamwood Institute for treatment to cure this problem, but the medical practices made him much worse, causing him to go completely insane after years of solitary confinement, having his head locked in a cage after breaking out of his straitjacket, and developing a hatred of humanity. When the asylum burst into flames, he chose to stay behind and perish in the fire. His ghost carries his torn straitjacket with the torn cubic head cage; it is called a sign of Hell's Winter. He is one of the more aggressive and violent ghosts, attacking and nearly killing Kathy before Kalina saves her.
 The Juggernaut: (played by John De Santis) Horace 'Breaker' Mahoney was born very disfigured and was an outcast his entire life. His mother abandoned him at a tender age, and his dad put him to work in the junkyard, using his unusual strength to crush cars. After his dad died, Horace went insane: he would take motorists and hitchhikers, tear them apart with his bare hands and feed the remains to his dogs. After several of these murders, he was arrested. A SWAT team shot and killed him when he broke free of his hand cuffs. As a ghost, he remained at the junkyard with his body riddled with bullet holes, killing intruders. Both Dennis and Cyrus remark that his kill count numbered in the 40s, making this ghost one of the most evil and dangerous of the twelve.

Release

Home media 
The film was released on VHS and DVD on April 2, 2002. The film initially debuted on the Blu-ray format on October 19, 2010 in a double feature with House of Wax (2005).

A special collector's edition Blu-ray was released by Shout Factory under their Scream Factory label on July 28, 2020. This new release features brand new interviews with the cast and crew, plus a brand new audio commentary with director Steve Beck.

Reception

Box office 
In the US, the film opened ranking 2nd, making $15,165,355. It spent 10 weeks in the US box office, eventually making $41,867,960 domestically, and $68,467,960 worldwide.

Critical reception 

Reviews for the film were mostly negative. Praise was directed toward the production design but the film was criticized for its lack of scares and a number of strobe effects throughout that could induce seizures. It holds an approval rating of 18% on review aggregator Rotten Tomatoes, based on 95 reviews with an average rating of 3.6/10. The website's critical consensus reads, "The production design is first rate, but 13 Ghosts is distinctly lacking in scares." On Metacritic, the film has a weighted average score of 30 out of 100, based on reviews from 24 critics, indicating "generally unfavorable reviews". Audiences polled by CinemaScore gave the film an average grade of "C+" on an A+ to F scale.

Ed Gonzalez of Slant Magazine rated the film two out of four stars, panning the film's lack of scares, and predictable plot twists. However, Gonzalez commended the art direction, while also stating it was underutilized. 
Roger Ebert praised the production values saying, "The production is first-rate...The physical look of the picture is splendid." However, he criticized the story, lack of interesting characters, loud soundtrack, and poor editing. In 2005 Ebert included it on his list of "Most Hated" films.
In the years since its release and disappointing box office performance, the film has gathered a prominent cult following, finding further success and more positive reception. Elvis Mitchell of The New York Times said of the film "what we're left with after the scares is just plain dumb."

See also 
 List of ghost films

References

External links 

 
 
 

2001 films
2001 directorial debut films
2001 horror films
2000s ghost films
2000s supernatural horror films
Remakes of American films
American ghost films
American haunted house films
American supernatural horror films
Canadian supernatural horror films
Columbia Pictures films
Dark Castle Entertainment films
Fictional ghosts
Films about inheritances
Films based on works by Robb White
Films produced by Joel Silver
Films set in country houses
Films shot in Vancouver
Films scored by John Frizzell (composer)
Horror film remakes
Warner Bros. films
2000s English-language films
Films produced by Robert Zemeckis
Films produced by Gilbert Adler
2000s American films
2000s Canadian films